Ioan Yakovlev (born 19 January 1998) is an Estonian professional footballer who currently plays as a winger for Meistriliiga club FCI Levadia and the Estonia national team.

Club career
Yakovlev played for Tallinna Kalev in Meistriliiga for the 2022 season. He was awarded Meistriliiga Player of the Month in May. At the end of the season his goal on 15 October 2022 against Paide Linnameeskond was tied in the Goal of the Season vote. He finished the season with 6 goals in 33 matches and the highest number of assists in the league (13).

In December 2022 he signed a 2 and a half year deal with FCI Levadia.

International career
Yakovlev made his senior international debut for Estonia on 8 January 2023, in a 1–1 draw against Iceland in a friendly.

Personal
He held Estonian citizenship, but had to give it up and take Russian citizenship when he joined the academy of Zenit Saint Petersburg.
Yakovlev regained Estonian citizenship in 2022.

References

External links

1998 births
Living people
Sportspeople from Narva
Estonian footballers
Estonian people of Russian descent
Association football wingers
FCI Levadia U21 players
JK Narva Trans players
JK Tallinna Kalev players
Atlético Saguntino players
Arandina CF players
SCR Peña Deportiva players
FCI Levadia Tallinn players
Esiliiga players
Meistriliiga players
Tercera División players
Estonia international footballers
Estonian expatriate footballers
Expatriate footballers in Russia
Estonian expatriate sportspeople in Russia
Expatriate footballers in Spain
Estonian expatriate sportspeople in Spain